Kharg may refer to:
 Kharg Island
 Kharg, Iran, a city on the island
 Kharg District, an administrative subdivision of Iran
 IRIS Kharg, a ship of the Iranian navy